Shamji v Johnson Matthey Bankers Ltd [1991] BCLC 36 is a UK insolvency law case concerning the administration procedure when a company is unable to repay its debts.

Facts
Shamji controlled a group of companies. They were in debt to JMB who had mortgages and guarantees. JMB wanted payment. The bank agreed to release the debt if Shamji paid £14m within 21 days and this could be extended by 14 days if the bank viewed negotiations as proceeding properly. Six days after the 21-day period, JMB appointed receivers. Shamji and the companies went to court for an injunction, arguing the bank had breached the contract. They argued there was a duty on JMB as mortgagee, when appointing a receiver, to consider relevant matters including the effect of an appointment on refinancing negotiations.

Judgment

High Court
Hoffmann J dismissed the appeal. He said the bank was entitled contractually to appoint receivers. It owed no duty of care when doing so to any mortgagor or guarantor. It was protecting its interests and could not be challenged.

Court of Appeal
Oliver LJ affirmed the decision of Hoffmann J. Nourse LJ agreed.

See also

UK insolvency law

Notes

References
L Sealy and S Worthington, Cases and Materials in Company Law (9th edn OUP 2010)
R Goode, Principles of Corporate Insolvency Law (4th edn Sweet & Maxwell 2011)

United Kingdom insolvency case law
Court of Appeal (England and Wales) cases
1991 in case law
1991 in British law